Phrictus regalis is a species of insect from the genus Phrictus.

References

Fulgorinae
Insects described in 1945